Amegilla cingulifera, is a species of bee belonging to the family Apidae subfamily Apinae.

References

External links
 Animal Diversity Web
 academia.edu

Apinae
Insects described in 1910